Matthias Adamczewski (born 31 March 1958) is a German sailor. He competed in the 1988 Summer Olympics.

References

1958 births
Living people
Sailors at the 1988 Summer Olympics – Soling
German male sailors (sport)
Olympic sailors of West Germany
Sportspeople from Kiel